Lachnocnema magna, the large woolly legs, is a butterfly in the family Lycaenidae. It is found in eastern Nigeria, Cameroon, the Republic of the Congo, the Democratic Republic of the Congo, and Uganda.

References

External links

Seitz, A. Die Gross-Schmetterlinge der Erde 13: Die Afrikanischen Tagfalter. Plate XIII 65 f

Butterflies described in 1895
Miletinae
Butterflies of Africa